This annotated bibliography is intended to list both notable and not so notable works of English language, non-fiction and fiction related to the sport of roller derby listed by topic and format, and then year.  Although 100% of any book listed is not necessarily devoted to roller derby, all these titles have significant roller skating and roller derby content. Included in this bibliography is a list of classic texts, roller derby history texts and roller derby local league created materials devoted to roller derby.

Annotations
Annotations may reflect descriptive comments from the book's dust jacket, third party reviews or personal, descriptive and qualitative comments by individuals who have read the book.  Some older works have links to online versions in the Internet Archive or Google Books.

Print

Books

Roller derby history, bibliographies and literature reviews

General roller derby

Newspapers and magazines
 
 
 
 
 
 
 
 
 
 
 fiveonfive, the official magazine of the Women's Flat Track Derby Association
 Blood and Thunder, published since 2005
 Hit and Miss, Australian magazine
 Inside Line, British magazine

League publications

Film, television, sound

Documentaries

See also

 Annotated bibliography
 Roller derby

Annotations

Roller derby
Roller derby